The Lambda2 method, or Lambda2 vortex criterion, is a vortex core line detection algorithm that can adequately identify vortices from a three-dimensional fluid velocity field. The Lambda2 method is Galilean invariant, which means it produces the same results when a uniform velocity field is added to the existing velocity field or when the field is translated.

Description 
The flow velocity of a fluid is a vector field which is used to mathematically describe the motion of a continuum. 
The length of the flow velocity vector is the flow speed and is a scalar. The flow velocity  of a fluid is a vector field

which gives the velocity of an element of fluid at a position  and time 
The Lambda2 method determines for any point  in the fluid whether this point is part of a vortex core. A vortex is now defined as a connected region for which every point inside this region is part of a vortex core.

Usually one will also obtain a large number of small vortices when using the above definition. In order to detect only real vortices, a threshold can be used to discard any vortices below a certain size (e.g. volume or number of points contained in the vortex).

Definition 
The Lambda2 method consists of several steps. First we define the velocity gradient tensor ;

where  is the velocity field.
The velocity gradient tensor is then decomposed into its symmetric and antisymmetric parts:

 and  

where T is the transpose operation. Next the three eigenvalues of
 are calculated so that for each
The eigenvalues are ordered in such a way that .
A point in the velocity field is part of a vortex core only if at least two of its eigenvalues are negative i.e. if . This is what gave the Lambda2 method its name.

Using the Lambda2 method, a vortex can be defined as a connected region where  is negative. However, in situations where several vortices exist, it can be difficult for this method to distinguish between individual vortices

. The Lambda2 method has been used in practice to, for example, identify vortex rings present in the blood flow inside the human heart

References 

Vortices
Computational fluid dynamics